Carlos Jorge Neto Martins (born 29 April 1982) is a Portuguese former footballer. An attacking midfielder, he was noted for his long-range shots.

His career, during which he represented both Sporting CP and Benfica, was marred by injury and discipline problems. He also played professionally in Spain, with Recreativo and Granada, and amassed Primeira Liga totals of 201 matches and 18 goals over 12 seasons.

A member of Portugal's team at the 2004 Olympics, Martins earned 17 senior caps for his nation.

Club career

Sporting CP
Born in Oliveira do Hospital, Coimbra District, Martins was a youth product of Sporting CP, joining its ranks at the age of 11. He made his professional debut with modest S.C. Campomaiorense in the Segunda Liga and, from January–June 2003, was again loaned, to Primeira Liga side Académica de Coimbra.

In the 2005–06 season, despite suffering from several physical problems as well as disciplinary issues, Martins was still able to score two goals in only 13 starts.

Recreativo
However, in February 2007, after several bouts of indiscipline at Sporting, coach Paulo Bento ostracised Martins for the final three months of the campaign, and although a player still under contract, moving abroad was the only option for the player and, in June, he transferred to La Liga team Recreativo de Huelva.

In November, Portuguese network RTP Internacional interviewed Martins about his situation at Sporting and the player responded: "My situation with coach Bento has been a very bad one. I was constantly pressured to perform and when I did eventually get the call-up to the national side, it got so far that it almost turned into a physical confrontation". Bento denied this despite media sources releasing information of the two that went back to the manager's playing career at Sporting.

Martins finished the season with seven goals in 35 competitive appearances, his only in the Copa del Rey coming in a 1–1 home draw against Xerez CD in the round of 32.

Benfica
On 1 July 2008, Martins signed a five-year deal with S.L. Benfica, with the club paying €3 million for the transfer (40% to Recreativo, 40% to Sporting and 20% to the player). Regularly used during his first year although never an undisputed starter, he netted his first goal for the team in a 2–0 win at Vitória de Guimarães in the Taça da Liga. Also in that competition, he scored the decider in the penalty shootout final victory over former side Sporting, on 21 March 2009.

Martins lost some starting XI room early into the following season, mainly due to recurrent injuries; however, he bounced back and figured prominently for Jorge Jesus' side. On 21 March 2010, exactly 365 days after the last final, he helped them renew their League Cup supremacy as he netted in a 3–0 defeat of FC Porto from a 30-meter free kick.

On 13 August 2011, Benfica loaned Martins to Granada CF – recently promoted to the Spanish top division – in a season-long move. He appeared regularly as a starter during his spell but, although the Andalusians attempted to renew his loan deal, the Portuguese rejected, only allowing the player to leave on a permanent basis.

After a successful 2012 preseason, where he scored several goals, Martins renewed his contract in August until 2016. Appearing sporadically throughout the campaign, he did feature as a substitute in a match against G.D. Estoril-Praia on 6 May 2013: with the game tied 1–1 and Benfica looking to score, he was booked in the 70th minute and, eight minutes later, was sent off after another foul in an eventual home draw that eventually saw his team lose the title race to Porto. He was subsequently told to look for a new club after manager Jesus deemed him surplus to requirements but, after being unable to do so, he spent the entire 2013–14 with the reserves in the second tier, only appearing after the winter transfer window.

Belenenses
On 16 September 2014, Martins terminated his contract with Benfica. The following month he signed for one year with fellow league club C.F. Os Belenenses, making his official debut on 7 January 2015 by starting in a 7–1 away loss against S.C. Braga in the Portuguese Cup.

Martins scored a brace to help his team defeat IFK Göteborg 2–1 at the Estádio do Restelo on 30 July 2015, in the first leg of the third qualifying round of the UEFA Europa League.

International career

After Portugal finished in fourth place at the 2006 FIFA World Cup Martins, a former under-21 international, was called to the senior squad for the first time for a friendly with Denmark and a UEFA Euro 2008 qualifier against Finland in September. He made his debut in the former fixture, on the first day of the month.

Appearing rarely the following four years, Martins received a surprise callup in September 2010 for Euro 2012 qualifying campaign matches against Denmark and Iceland, as former Sporting coach Bento was in charge of the national team: he started in both games, consecutive 3–1 wins.

Martins missed the final stages in Poland and Ukraine after featuring regularly in the qualifiers, however, having contracted an injury in late May 2012 already in training camp.

Personal life
On 15 November 2011, during Portugal's Euro 2012 playoff home fixture against Bosnia and Herzegovina, it was announced that Martins' three-year-old son Gustavo suffered from a rare bone marrow condition, needing an urgent transplant. The player spent nearly two weeks in his country, returning to action for Granada (as a starter) in a home game against RCD Mallorca on the 20th, scoring the 1–1 equaliser and being booked shortly afterwards for a reckless challenge, with the game being eventually suspended minutes later after a 15-year-old spectator hit the assistant referee with an umbrella.

Martins' younger brother, João, was also a footballer and a midfielder. He also graduated from Sporting's youth academy, but spent most of his career in the lower leagues.

Career statistics

Club

International goals

Honours
Sporting CP
Taça de Portugal: 2006–07
Supertaça Cândido de Oliveira: 2002
UEFA Cup runner-up: 2004–05

Benfica
Primeira Liga: 2009–10
Taça da Liga: 2008–09, 2009–10, 2010–11
Taça de Portugal runner-up: 2012–13
Supertaça Cândido de Oliveira runner-up: 2010
UEFA Europa League runner-up: 2012–13

Portugal
Toulon Tournament: 2001

References

External links

1982 births
Living people
People from Oliveira do Hospital
Sportspeople from Coimbra District
Portuguese footballers
Association football midfielders
Primeira Liga players
Liga Portugal 2 players
Segunda Divisão players
Sporting CP B players
Sporting CP footballers
S.C. Campomaiorense players
Associação Académica de Coimbra – O.A.F. players
S.L. Benfica footballers
S.L. Benfica B players
C.F. Os Belenenses players
La Liga players
Recreativo de Huelva players
Granada CF footballers
Portugal youth international footballers
Portugal under-21 international footballers
Portugal international footballers
Olympic footballers of Portugal
Footballers at the 2004 Summer Olympics
Portuguese expatriate footballers
Expatriate footballers in Spain
Portuguese expatriate sportspeople in Spain